The Main Street Commercial District is a historic district encompassing a typical downtown city block of Little Rock, Arkansas, during the first half of the 20th century.  The district consists of ten buildings lining the east side of the 300 block of Main Street.  This area was completely redeveloped after a fire in February 1900 sparked an explosion at an arms company, levelling the block.  The buildings in the district are stylistically diverse, and were built between 1900 and 1955.

The district was listed on the National Register of Historic Places in 2010.  Four of the district's buildings are also individually listed on the National Register: the Fulk Building, the Taylor Building, the Rose Building, and the Gus Blass Department Store.

See also
National Register of Historic Places listings in Little Rock, Arkansas

References

Historic districts on the National Register of Historic Places in Arkansas
Romanesque Revival architecture in Arkansas
Buildings and structures in Little Rock, Arkansas
National Register of Historic Places in Little Rock, Arkansas